Strictly Leakage is a mixtape by American hip hop group Atmosphere. It was released as a free download through Rhymesayers Entertainment in 2007.

Reception
Jordan Selbo of City Pages gave Strictly Leakage an unfavorable review, saying, "[the] once-bright style Atmosphere became famous for is so established and well-tread that it has now become the status quo they once rebelled so infectiously against."

Writing for Impose, Blake Gillepsie wrote that "as much as Atmosphere rewind to simpler times with Strictly Leakage, Slug has a new writing approach, that of a wise elder that alienates him from his predominantly young audience."

On January 4, 2008, Strictly Leakage was listed by Wired as the "Best Free Download of the Week". On December 19, 2008, it was ranked at number 9 on NPR's "10 Best Mixtapes of the Year" list.

Track listing

References

External links
 

2007 albums
Atmosphere (music group) albums
Rhymesayers Entertainment albums